Great and Little Wigborough is a civil parish about  from Colchester, in the Colchester district, in the county of Essex, England. The parish includes the villages of Great Wigborough and Little Wigborough and the hamlet of Stafford's Corner on the B1026 road. In 2011 the parish had a population of 246. The parish touches Layer Breton, Layer-de-la-Haye, Layer Marney, Peldon, Salcott, Tollesbury, Tolleshunt Knights, Virley and West Mersea. The civil parish forms part of the Winstred Hundred Parish Council. There are 18 listed buildings in Great and Little Wigborough.

History 
The name "Wigborough" means 'Wicga's hill'. Wigborough was recorded in the Domesday Book as Wi(c)gheberga. On 1 April 1935 the parish was created from "Great Wigborough", "Little Wigborough" and part of Layer de la Haye.

References 

Civil parishes in Essex
Borough of Colchester